Ghetto Justice II is a Hong Kong modern drama series produced by TVB. It is a sequel to the 2011 hit series Ghetto Justice. This sequel features original cast members Kevin Cheng, Myolie Wu, Sam Lee and Alex Lam with the addition of new cast members JJ Jia, Raymond Cho, Christine Kuo, Crystal Li and Elena Kong. Joyce Tang (who played as Tai-Ng Ting) and Eddie Kwan (played as But Chik) didn't reprise their roles in the sequel and was excused off in the series.

Plot
A year and half has passed since the events of Ghetto Justice; Law Lik-ah (aka LA Law) is released from jail and restarts life back in Sham Shui Po. Certain friends have come and left, but the people of the district still suffer from injustice and both LA and Kris (Myolie Wu) find means to seek justice for the locals.

Cast

Main cast

The Wong family

The Ting family

Other cast

Production
Filming began on 6 October where a costume fitting and blessing ceremony was held at Studio One Parking Lot of the TVB City in Tseung Kwan O, Hong Kong at 12:30PM.

Viewership ratings
The following is a table that includes a list of the total ratings points based on television viewership.

References

TVB dramas
Hong Kong comedy television series
2012 Hong Kong television series debuts
2012 Hong Kong television series endings